A list of films produced in France in 1914.

See also
 1914 in France

External links
 French films of 1914 at the Internet Movie Database

1914
Lists of 1914 films by country or language
Films